Hoppers Football Club is an Antiguan football club playing in the Antigua and Barbuda Premier Division. It is based in Greenbay.

History
The Greenbay Hoppers FC is a nonprofit organization which was formed over 40 years ago. One of the founders, Mr. Londel Benjamin who was President until 2009, along with fathers, grandfathers and uncles of present players organized a football team from the Greenbay community.

Greenbay Hoppers FC took part in the CFU Club Championship in an attempt to qualify for the CONCACAF Champions Cup.

Achievements
Antigua and Barbuda Premier Division: 2
2015–16, 2017–18

CTV Warriors' Cup: 1
2005

Performance in CONCACAF competitions
CFU Club Championship: 2 appearances
Best: 2005 Quarter-Finals – Lost against  Portmore United 10 – 0 on aggregate

References

Football clubs in Antigua and Barbuda
1969 establishments in Antigua and Barbuda